Luca Andrea Crescenzi (born 2 April 1992) is an Italian footballer who plays as a defender for  club Siena.

Club career
He made his professional debut in the Lega Pro for Nocerina on 9 September 2012 in a game against Prato.

He joined Lugano in 2017.

On 2 September 2019, he signed a 2-year contract with Como.

On 31 January 2022, Crescenzi signed a contract with Siena until 30 June 2023.

Honours

Club 
Como
 Serie C: 2020–21 (Group A)

References

External links
 
 
 

1992 births
Living people
Footballers from Rome
Italian footballers
Association football defenders
Serie B players
Serie C players
S.S. Lazio players
A.S.G. Nocerina players
F.C. Esperia Viareggio players
A.C.N. Siena 1904 players
Pisa S.C. players
Reggina 1914 players
S.S. Arezzo players
L.R. Vicenza players
F.C. Pro Vercelli 1892 players
Como 1907 players
FC Lugano players
Italian expatriate footballers
Italian expatriate sportspeople in Switzerland
Expatriate footballers in Switzerland
Italy youth international footballers